Pincer Point is a narrow rock point lying 4 nautical miles (7 km) east-southeast of Durham Point, near the northwest end of the Tapley Mountains. First seen and roughly mapped by the Byrd Antarctic Expedition, 1928–30. So named by Advisory Committee on Antarctic Names (US-ACAN) because its appearance is similar to a part of a pincers.

Headlands of the Ross Dependency
Gould Coast